Uttai Tawee is a Thai lakorn Boran that aired on Thai Channel 7 in 2003. It is a remake of a 1989 lakorn of the same name, and stars Bee Madthika and Auot. It is about a girl named Uttai Tawee. Her mother is a dragon princess and her father is a tree god.

Summary
Uttai Tawee is a half god and half dragon girl, who was born from an egg. Her parents met and fell in love after her father saved her mother from being kidnapped by an eagle god. Her parents were forced to part because their relationship was forbidden, since they are from different species. Her father went to the heavens to receive his punishment for falling in love with a dragon. Her mother returned to her underwater kingdom to live as a nun to atone for the sins of loving a god and having his child. She would pray to the gods not to punish her daughter for their mistakes. While Uttai Tawee was still inside the egg, her mother gave her to a group of forest creatures to raise. The forest creatures consist of a male snake, a female parrot, and a male turtle. The animals swore to raise Uttai Tawee and love her to repay her parents back for saving their lives from a forest fire and for giving them the abilities to speak and turn into humans. The dragon princess also left a magic ring, in the shape of a dragon, to her daughter for protection. Before Uttai Tawee could hatch she was swallowed by a large frog. The frog died from the protective poison her mother had placed on the shell of the egg. The animals return to her nest to find the missing egg and the dead frog nearby and argued about what had happened to the egg. Uttai Tawee emerged from the frog in a child form to end their argument. As a child Uttai Tawee grew up in the forest without knowing who her mother was. Her father visited her once to teach her how to control her magical powers, but couldn't stay with her long, since he still had to endure his punishment. Uttai Tawee hid herself in a frog skin to allow herself to freely roam around the forest. She found a small village near the forest and yearns to play with children her age. Some of the children would play with her, while others shunned her for being a stranger and not knowing who her parents were. Their rejection saddened her.

One day, while Uttai Tawee was in her frog skin, she was captured by a poor old man for dinner. He took her home to feed himself and his wife. They were going to cook her but was interrupted when she started speaking and by a group of men outside. The old man was an addicted gambler and owed them money, which he couldn't pay. Feeling sorry for the couple, Uttai Tawee told them where to find jewels buried underground to pay for the debts. She made the old man swear that he would quit gambling. She would cook for them and lie about how the food got there. The couple adored her and decided to keep her as a pet. One day, they found her in human form and realized that she was not a frog, but a small child. They were going to destroy the frog skin so she could remain human with them. She caught them and asked them why they are doing that. The couple explained to her that she shouldn't have to wear a frog's skin if she was such a beautiful child. She told them that she wanted to keep the frog's skin, but will remain in human form if they wanted her too. From then on they looked after her as their granddaughter. Uttai Tawee lived with the old couple and visited her forest friends.

Uttai Tawee grew up to be the most beautiful girl in the kingdom, and all of the men fell in love with her. A young prince who passed by her village saw her and they fell in love. They were not allowed to marry because Uttai Tawee was only a poor commoner, while the prince was a wealthy nobleman. The prince's mother disliked Uttai Tawee, since she had already promised that the prince would marry the daughter of a friend of hers, an evil princess from another kingdom. The queen set Uttai Tawee the task of building a house of gold, and the prince was tasked with building a bridge of gold, before they might marry. Uttai Tawee used her magic to make the golden house in seconds. While the prince instructed workers to build the bridge. The evil princess and her men destroyed every bridge the prince built because she was angry that he had rejected her for a commoner. Uttai Tawee and the prince prayed to the gods and asked them for help. If they were soul mates, please allow the bridge to be complete and it did. Finally Uttai Tawee and the prince married and lived very happily. The jealous princess would travel to the prince's kingdom to rob and terrorize his people. Everyone knew that the bandits were from her kingdom but couldn't do anything about it as there was no proof that it was them. The prince had to decide to go to the evil princess's kingdom to ask her to spare his people from her attacks. This left Uttai Tawee alone with his parents, who by now accepted her as their daughter-in-law. Before they parted the prince had life size statues of them made. He took  her statue with him while she kept his.

When the prince arrived the evil princess tried to make him fall in love with her, but he ignores her. Having enough the princess put a love spell on him so that he would be her love slave and stay with her. The princess sends her older brother to kill Uttai Tawee so no one would get between her and the prince. She and her minion showed her brother how Uttai Tawee looked like and the evil prince fell madly in love with her. He changed his plans and tried to seduce Uttai Tawee instead. Uttai Tawee was sad when she found out that her husband fell in love with another woman and married her. She doesn't like the evil prince but remains kind and respectful to him as he is a guest. When she discovered the evil princess' plans, Uttai made a statue of herself and placed it in the Prince's room. When the jealous princess saw it, she tried to melt it, but the statue came to life and fought her off. The jealous princess tried to drown it in the river but good overcame evil and the prince was freed of his spell. He returned to Uttai Tawee but the jealous princess sent Krok, the powerful enemy of Uttai's parents. With the help of her grandfather the king dragon, her animal friends, and her father the tree god, Uttai vanquished Krok along with the jealous princess and her brother. The jealous princess's parents were sorry for their daughter's misdeeds and returned to their kingdom. The lakorn ends with Uttai Tawee and her prince living happily together.

Thai television soap operas
2000s Thai television series
2003 Thai television series debuts
Channel 7 (Thailand) original programming